Mycobacterium murale

Description
Gram-positive, nonmotile and acid-fast rods or coccobacilli (0.4-0.5 µm x 0.6-1.4 µm).

Colony characteristics
Smooth and scotochromogenic colonies of saffron yellow color.

Physiology
Growth on Middlebrook 7H10 agar at 10-37 °C, optimum at 30 °C within 5 days.
Susceptible to amikacin, azithromycin, ciprofloxacin, clarithromycin and ethambutol.
Resistant to isoniazid.

Differential characteristics
Mycobacterium murale and Mycobacterium tokaiense share an identical 5'-16S rDNA sequence
However the ITS sequence of both species differs.

Pathogenesis
Not known.

Type strain
First isolated from water-damaged indoor building material, Finland.
Strain MA112/96 = CCUG 39728 = CIP 105980 = DSM 44340 = HAMBI 2320 = JCM 13392.

References

Vuorio et al. 1999. A new rapidly growing mycobacterial species, Mycobacterium murale sp. nov., isolated from the indoor walls of a children's day care centre. Int. J. Syst. Bacteriol., 1999, 49, 25–35.

External links
Type strain of Mycobacterium murale at BacDive -  the Bacterial Diversity Metadatabase

Acid-fast bacilli
murale
Bacteria described in 1999